A by-election was held for the New South Wales Legislative Assembly electorate of Braidwood on 17 October 1870 because the elections and qualifications committee declared the election of Michael Kelly to be void.

Dates

Results

The December 1869 Braidwood election was declared to be void.

See also
Electoral results for the district of Braidwood
List of New South Wales state by-elections

References

1870 elections in Australia
New South Wales state by-elections
1870s in New South Wales